Joseph Zeglinski (born February 18, 1987) is an American former professional basketball player who played for Horsens IC of the Danish Basketball League from June 2011 to December 2011. He was known to be a prominent three-point shooter in his college basketball years with Hartford, recording the 15th most three-pointers in NCAA Division I men's basketball history as of the end of the 2013–14 season. He scored 2,016 points in his Hartford career.

His brother Sammy Zeglinski plays professional basketball.

References

External links
Hartford profile
College statistics @ sports-reference.com

1987 births
Living people
American expatriate basketball people in Denmark
American men's basketball players
Basketball players from Philadelphia
Hartford Hawks men's basketball players
Horsens IC players
Shooting guards